George Francis Hugh Cambridge, 2nd Marquess of Cambridge,  (11 October 1895 – 16 April 1981), known as Prince George of Teck until 1917 and as Earl of Eltham from 1917 to 1927, was a relative of the British royal family, a great-great-grandson of King George III and nephew of Queen Mary and King George V. He was also nephew to the 1st Earl of Athlone. He was the elder son of the 1st Marquess of Cambridge, formerly the Duke of Teck, and his wife, the former Lady Margaret Grosvenor.

Early life
Born at Grosvenor House, the home of his maternal grandfather, the 1st Duke of Westminster, he was styled His Serene Highness Prince George of Teck from birth. On his father's side, he was descended from King George III and—morganatically—from the Royal House of Württemberg. In June 1917, at the request of George V, his father relinquished the titles, styles, and designations, "Highness", "Duke of Teck" and "of Teck" in the Kingdom of Württemberg and the German Empire, and assumed the surname Cambridge by Royal Licence and Warrant. The former Duke of Teck was subsequently created Marquess of Cambridge, Earl of Eltham and Viscount Northallerton in the Peerage of the United Kingdom. Prince George became George Cambridge and was styled Earl of Eltham as a courtesy title. He succeeded his father as 2nd Marquess of Cambridge on 24 October 1927. He was appointed a Knight Commander of the Royal Victorian Order in June 1927 and was promoted to Knight Grand Cross in June 1935.

Education and career
Prince George of Teck was educated at Ludgrove School and Eton College followed by Magdalen College, Oxford. He joined the Reserve Regiment of the 1st Life Guards during World War I and served as an aide-de-camp on the Personal Staff in 1918–1919.

In the inter-war years, he served with the Territorial Army as a lieutenant in the Shropshire Yeomanry from 1921, then as captain in the 16th Battalion, London Regiment from 1929 to 1932.

At the outbreak of World War II he mobilised as Captain with the Royal Army Service Corps and served in France, rising to rank of Major.

In 1929, he became a director of Coutts & Company, a banking firm. This made him the second member of the British royal family (albeit, a very minor one) to pursue a career in the City of London. He remained with the firm until his retirement in 1951.

Personal life
On 10 April 1923, he married Dorothy Isabel Westenra Hastings (18 May 1899 Cirencester – 1 April 1988), daughter of The Hon. Osmund William Toone Westenra Hastings, who was a younger son of the 13th Earl of Huntingdon.

The couple had one child, Lady Mary Cambridge (24 September 1924 – 13 December 1999).

Lord and Lady Cambridge regularly attended major royal occasions, although they did not carry out royal duties. Lord Cambridge participated in the coronations of George V, George VI, and Elizabeth II. For many years he served as Royal Trustee of the British Museum.

Lord Cambridge died on 16 April 1981 in Little Abington, and was buried in the Royal Burial Ground, Frogmore. His peerages became extinct. His brother, Lord Frederick Cambridge, had died while fighting in Belgium during World War II.

Arms

Ancestry

References

1895 births
1981 deaths
People educated at Eton College
Alumni of Magdalen College, Oxford
Knights Grand Cross of the Royal Victorian Order
George
Burials at the Royal Burial Ground, Frogmore
Shropshire Yeomanry officers
Marquesses of Cambridge
German princes
Royal Army Service Corps officers
British Army personnel of World War I
British Life Guards officers
British Army personnel of World War II
People educated at Ludgrove School